Liam Fox is a British politician.

Liam Fox may also refer to:

Liam Fox (footballer) (born 1984), Scottish football player and coach
Liam Fox (actor)  (born 1970), British actor